William Joseph Schneider (born April 25, 1959) is a Maine politician and lawyer. Schneider was elected the attorney general of Maine by the State Legislature following its takeover by the Republican Party in the election of 2010, and served until 2013.  He is a retired United States Army officer. In March 2012, he announced his candidacy for the Republican nomination for U.S. Senate, seeking to replace retiring Republican Olympia Snowe, but was unsuccessful.

Life and career
He was born in Syracuse, New York and entered into the U.S. Army in 1977. He served in South Korea and joined the Green Berets. He was permanently disabled in an automobile accident in 1985 in Fort Devens, Massachusetts. In 1990, Schneider enrolled at the University of Maine School of Law and eventually worked in the Cumberland County District Attorney's office.

In 1998, Schneider ran for and won a seat in the Maine House of Representatives, representing his hometown of Durham and portions of Brunswick and Lisbon. He was re-elected in 2000 and chosen the Assistant Republican Leader until 2002.

As Attorney General of Maine, Schneider joined other Attorneys General in challenging the constitutionality of the Affordable Care Act.

Maine Republicans nominated Schneider to serve a second term after the 2012 elections, but the newly elected Democratic legislature selected the previous holder of the position, Janet Mills, to serve again.  After his term ended, Governor Paul LePage hired Schneider as the deputy director of the Office of Policy and Management.

On February 7, 2014, Gov. LePage nominated Schneider for a District Court judgeship. His nomination was unanimously confirmed by the Maine Senate on March 18, 2014.

References

1959 births
Living people
American politicians with disabilities
Lawyers from Syracuse, New York
LePage Administration
Maine Attorneys General
Republican Party members of the Maine House of Representatives
Members of the United States Army Special Forces
People from Durham, Maine
Politicians from Syracuse, New York
Politicians with paraplegia
United States Army officers
United States Military Academy alumni
University of Maine School of Law alumni